The Unionville Seaforths were a junior ice hockey team that played in the now defunct Metro Junior A League for one season, in 1961-62. Unionville were previously a Junior B team, going by the name of the Unionville Jets, prior to being promoted to the new league in 1961.

Cliff Simpson and Peanuts O'Flaherty shared the team's coaching duties. The team finished in last place, one point behind the Brampton 7Ups. Wayne Carleton was their only alumnus to play in the National Hockey League, but was a more prolific scorer after switching to the World Hockey Association.

After a poor first season in the tiny bandbox arena in Unionville, the Seaforths moved to downtown Toronto, becoming the Toronto Knob Hill Farms.

Yearly Results

Defunct Ontario Hockey League teams